Kindrochit Castle is a ruined 14th-century fortification in Aberdeenshire, Scotland. It is located at Braemar, in a strategic position on the banks of the Clunie Water, a tributary of the River Dee. The ruins are protected as a scheduled monument.

Kindrochit was a hunting seat of King Robert II, who issued charters here most years between 1371 and 1388. In 1390 Robert III granted a licence to Malcolm Drummond to build a new tower on the site.

John Erskine, Earl of Mar showed the ruined castle at Kindrochit to John Taylor when the poet made his Pennyles Pilgrimage to Scotland in 1618. Taylor, who rode with the Earl from Braemar Castle, was told that Malcolm Canmore had built the castle in the 11th century. He thought it remarkable because he did not see another house in the next 12 days of their ride.

C. Michael Hogan has suggested that Kindrochit Castle, as well as Kildrummy and Durris Castles, were likely sited based upon strategic positions relative to the ancient Elsick Mounth trackway, which provided a strategic crossing of the Mounth of the Grampian Mountains.

References

Castles in Aberdeenshire
Ruined castles in Aberdeenshire
Scheduled Ancient Monuments in Aberdeenshire